Cannabigerol (CBG) is one of more than 120 identified cannabinoid compounds found in the plant genus Cannabis. Cannabigerol is the decarboxylated form of cannabigerolic acid, the parent molecule from which other cannabinoids are synthesized.

Cannabigerol is normally a minor constituent of cannabis. During plant growth, most of the cannabigerol is converted into other cannabinoids, primarily tetrahydrocannabinol (THC) or cannabidiol (CBD), leaving about 1% cannabigerol in the plant. Some strains, however, produce larger amounts of cannabigerol and cannabigerolic acid, while having low quantities of other cannabinoids, like THC and CBD.

Although cannabigerol is sold as a dietary supplement, its effects and safety for human consumption are undefined.

Biosynthesis

The biosynthesis of cannabigerol begins by loading hexanoyl-CoA onto a polyketide synthase assembly protein and subsequent condensation with three molecules of malonyl-CoA. This polyketide is cyclized to olivetolic acid via olivetolic acid cyclase, and then prenylated with a ten carbon isoprenoid precursor, geranyl pyrophosphate, using an aromatic prenyltransferase enzyme, geranyl-pyrophosphate—olivetolic acid geranyltransferase, to biosynthesize cannabigerolic acid, which can then be decarboxylated to yield cannabigerol.

Research
, no clinical research has been conducted to test the specific effects of cannabigerol in humans. Cannabigerol is under laboratory research to determine its pharmacological properties and potential effects in disease conditions, with no conclusions about therapeutic effects or safety, as of 2021.

Cannabigerol has affinity and activity at CB1 and CB2 cannabinoid receptors in vitro. It appears to be unique among cannabinoid compounds by also having high affinity and activity at alpha-2 adrenergic receptors and moderate activity at serotonin (5-HT) 1A receptors.

Safety concerns
Although general effects of its use as a dietary supplement remain undefined, the potent activity of cannabigerol at alpha-2 adrenergic receptors raises concerns about its safety for human consumption, possibly having unintended effects, such as bradycardia, arterial hypotension, and xerostomia.

FDA warning letters for dietary supplements
As of 2022, the US Food and Drug Administration has issued numerous warning letters to American companies for illegally marketing cannabis supplement products, including one selling cannabigerol products with unproven illegal claims of efficacy against the COVID-19 virus and inflammation.

Legal status 
Cannabigerol is not scheduled by the UN Convention on Psychotropic Substances. In the United States, cannabigerol derived from cannabis is illegal under the Controlled Substances Act, while cannabigerol derived from hemp is legal, as long as the hemp THC content is less than 0.3% of dry weight.

In Switzerland, it is legal to produce hemp rich in cannabigerol as a tobacco substitute, as long as its THC content remains below 1.0%.

See also 
 Cannabinoid
 Medical cannabis

References 

5-HT1A antagonists
Alpha-2 adrenergic receptor agonists
Phytocannabinoids
CB1 receptor antagonists
Resorcinols
Terpeno-phenolic compounds